Archangelo Crotti, (first name sometimes spelled Arcangelo) was a composer and monk who was active in 1608 at Ferrara in Italy.

In 1608 he published, in Venice, his Primo libro de' concerti ecclesiastici (First book of church concerts) including music in 1, 2, 3, 4, and 5 parts, with instrumental accompaniments. The instruments specified include cornetts, trombones and violins. The "Sancta Maria" from this collection anticipates the texture of the "Sonata sopra Sancta Maria"  of Claudio Monteverdi's Vespro della Beata Vergine of 1610.

References
Notes

External links

17th-century Italian composers
17th-century Christian monks
Italian male composers
Musicians from Ferrara
16th-century births
17th-century deaths
17th-century male musicians